Robert Anthony Grich (born January 15, 1949) is an American former professional baseball player. He played in Major League Baseball (MLB) as a second baseman for the Baltimore Orioles (–) and the California Angels (–). In 1981, Grich led the American League in home runs and won a Silver Slugger Award. A six-time All-Star, he also excelled as a defensive player, winning four consecutive Gold Glove Awards between 1973 and 1976. 

In 1988, Grich became the first inductee into the California Angels Hall of Fame; he was inducted into the Baltimore Orioles Hall of Fame in 1998. Grich currently works in the Angels' front office.

Baseball career
Grich attended Woodrow Wilson High School in Long Beach, California, and graduated in 1967. He was selected by the Baltimore Orioles in the first round (19th overall) of the 1967 Major League Baseball draft. Grich made his major league debut with Baltimore midway through the 1970 season at the age of 21. He struggled early in his career and received "encouragement" from manager Earl Weaver, who would say "Home run in Rochester" to him each time he flew out. That October, the Orioles defeated the Cincinnati Reds to win the World Series.

From 1969 through 1974, the Orioles featured a loaded roster that resulted in five AL East Division titles in six seasons. Grich's emergence was blocked by incumbent second baseman Davey Johnson, but the Orioles thought highly of Grich and traded Johnson to the Braves following the 1972 season, when the Orioles finished third in the division.

In 1973, Grich set an all-time major league fielding record with a .995 fielding percentage, and 12 seasons later in 1985, he broke the record again (.997). He won four consecutive Gold Glove Awards and made the American League All-Star squad six times. He was an excellent fielder, with good range, soft hands, and a good arm, and he was steady turning the double play.

Grich became a free agent following the 1976 season and signed a multi-year contract with the California Angels. The Angels originally planned to move Grich to shortstop as they had Jerry Remy at second. However, Grich suffered a herniated disk in his back trying to move an air-conditioning unit during the 1977 season and played in only 52 games. The Angels traded Remy to the Boston Red Sox for Don Aase and moved Grich back to second for the 1978 season.

Grich batted .294 in 1979, adding 30 homers and 101 RBI. In the strike-shortened 1981 season, Grich tied the lead in home runs (22, along with Tony Armas, Dwight Evans, and Eddie Murray), led in slugging average (.543), and hit a career-high .304.

While with the Orioles, Grich appeared in the American League Championship Series (ALCS) in 1973 and 1974, when Baltimore lost to Oakland. The Angels made their first three postseason appearances during Grich's tenure, but fell in the ALCS each time; losing to the Orioles in 1979 and to the Milwaukee Brewers in 1982. Grich came closest in his final MLB season (1986), when the Angels led the ALCS 3-1 and  needed just one more win to advance to the World Series. They blew a 5-2 lead to the Boston Red Sox in the ninth inning of Game 5, then lost the next two and were eliminated. Grich hit a home run in Game 5 that deflected off center fielder Dave Henderson's glove, putting the Angels on top 3-2. But with the Red Sox down to their final strike, Henderson hit a home run to put Boston ahead. In the post-game interviews following Game 7, Grich announced his retirement at the age of 37.

Over 17 major league seasons, Grich batted .266, with 320 doubles, 47 triples,  224 home runs, 864 RBI, 1033 runs, 1,833 hits, 1,087 bases on balls, 104 stolen bases, and a .371 on-base percentage in 2,008 games played. Commenting on his baseball career, he stated: "I was short on talent so I had to be long on intensity."

Highlights
 6-time All-Star (1972, 1974, 1976, 1979–80, 1982)
 4-time Gold Glove (1973–1976)
 Twice Top 10  MVP (1974, 1979)
 Led league in slugging average (1981)
 Led league in home runs (1981)
 First second baseman to lead AL in home runs since Nap Lajoie (1901) and in either league since Rogers Hornsby (1929).
 Hit three consecutive home runs in a game (1974)
 Set an AL 2B record with 484 putouts in a season (1974)
 The first player elected to the Angels' Hall of Fame (1996)

Hall of Fame candidacy

Grich became eligible for the National Baseball Hall of Fame in 1992. In the BBWAA election, he received 11 votes, or 2.6% of the vote, below the 5% threshold needed to stay on the ballot. He was therefore removed from future BBWAA ballots.

Using sabermetric statistics there is a compelling case for Grich to be in the Hall of Fame. As of 2017, Grich has the highest Jaffe Wins Above Replacement Score (JAWS) of any eligible position player not in the Hall of Fame, although his standard WAR is lower than that of Bill Dahlen and fellow second baseman Lou Whitaker; of the three second basemen inducted into the Hall of Fame (excluding Veterans Committee picks) since 1992, Grich has a higher WAR than all three. There are more than ten Hall of Fame second basemen with a lower JAWS. The JAWS statistic is particularly compelling given that it incorporates both career and peak year statistics. His 224 home runs as a second baseman ranks highly among the Hall of Famers in the position, as he ranked fourth all-time upon his retirement. In fact, from 1970 to 1986 (the time in which Grich played his career), only Joe Morgan hit more than Grich (228), and Grich was second in additional categories such as RBI, runs scored, hits, doubles, and walks.  Grich was one of five second basemen to have at four occasions of at least twelve home runs and eighty walks in a season, which he did seven times, more than players such as Roberto Alomar.

In the 2019 edition of the Bill James Handbook, James listed Grich as the 5th best position player missing from the Hall, and MLB historian John Thorn has stated Grich as the one player deserving of being reconsidered for the honor of being considered for the Hall of Fame.

References

External links

Bobby Grich at SABR (Baseball BioProject)

1949 births
Living people
American League home run champions
Baltimore Orioles players
California Angels players
Gold Glove Award winners
Baseball players from Michigan
Major League Baseball second basemen
Sportspeople from Muskegon, Michigan
American League All-Stars
Bluefield Orioles players
Stockton Ports players
Dallas–Fort Worth Spurs players
Rochester Red Wings players
International League MVP award winners
Silver Slugger Award winners
Wilson Classical High School alumni